These names of stars that have either been approved by the International Astronomical Union or which have been in somewhat recent use. IAU approval comes mostly from its Working Group on Star Names, which has been publishing a "List of IAU-approved Star Names" since 2016. As of August 2018, the list included a total of 336 proper names of stars.

Background
Of the roughly 10,000 stars visible to the naked eye, only a few hundred have been given proper names in the history of astronomy. Traditional astronomy tends to group stars into constellations or asterisms and give proper names to those, not to individual stars.

Many star names are, in origin, descriptive of the part of the constellation they are found in; thus Phecda, a corruption of Arabic  ('thigh of the bear'). Only a handful of the brightest stars have individual proper names not depending on their asterism; so Sirius ('the scorcher'), Antares ('rival of Ares', i.e., red-hued like Mars), Canopus (of uncertain origin), Alphard ('the solitary one'), Regulus ('kinglet'); and arguably Aldebaran ('the follower' [of the Pleiades]) and Procyon ('preceding the dog' [Sirius]).

In addition to the limited number of traditional star names, there were some coined in modern times, e.g. "Avior" for Epsilon Carinae (1930), and a number of stars named after people (mostly in the 20th century).

IAU catalog

In 2016, the International Astronomical Union (IAU) organized a Working Group on Star Names (WGSN) to catalog and standardize proper names for stars. The WGSN's first bulletin, dated July 2016, included a table of 125 stars comprising the first two batches of names approved by the WGSN (on 30 June and 20 July 2016) together with names of stars adopted by the IAU Executive Committee Working Group on the Public Naming of Planets and Planetary Satellites during the 2015 NameExoWorlds campaign and recognized by the WGSN. Further batches of names were approved on 21 August, 12 September, 5 October, and 6 November 2016. These were listed in a table of 102 stars included in the WGSN's second bulletin, dated November 2016. The next additions were done on 1 February 2017 (13 new star names), 30 June 2017 (29), 5 September 2017 (41), 17 November 2017 (3), 1 June 2018 (17), and on 10 August 2018 (6). All 336 names are included in the current List of IAU-approved Star Names, last updated on 10 August 2018.

In addition, in 2019 the IAU organised its IAU 100 NameExoWorlds campaign to name exoplanets and their host stars. The approved names of 112 exoplanets and their host stars were published on 17 December 2019.

List
In the table below, unless indicated by a "†" or "*", the "modern proper name" is the name approved by the WGSN and entered in the List of IAU-approved Star Names or otherwise approved by the IAU. The WGSN decided to attribute proper names to individual stars rather than entire multiple-star systems.
Names marked with a "†" are no longer approved, while names marked with a "*" are names that were proposed or accepted since the last update to the list on 10 August 2018.

For such names relating to members of multiple-star systems, and where a component letter (from, e.g., the Washington Double Star Catalog) is not explicitly listed, the WGSN says that the name should be understood to be attributed to the visually brightest component. In the "Historical names/comments" column, "IAU new 2015" and "IAU new 2019" denote that the name was approved by the IAU as a consequence of its 2015 and 2019 NameExoWorlds campaigns, respectively.

See also

 Biblical names of stars
 List of Arabic star names
 List of brightest stars
 List of nearest bright stars
 List of proper names of exoplanets
 Lists of stars by constellation – gives variant names, derivations, and magnitudes.
 NameExoWorlds
 Stars named after people
 Table of stars with Bayer designations
 Traditional Chinese star names

Footnotes

References

General references

See also
Lists of stars by constellation

External links
 SIMBAD (Set of Identifications, Measurements and Bibliography for Astronomical Data) online database
 Star names and meanings from Frosty Drew Observatory
 List of named stars in alphabetical order
 Star names, their meanings, and a list of additional resources
 Official star names, meanings, and pronunciations on SkyEye
 Names and etymologies for stars and other objects
 Table of popular and scientific star names
 Common name cross index on VizieR

 
Proper names
Stars Proper